Shikanjvi or Shikanjabeen is a lemon-based drink originating in the northern part of India and Pakistan. Alternative names include shikanji, shikanjbi and shikanjbeen. Shikanjvi is distinct from lemonade, and often contains other ingredients such as salt, saffron and cumin. It is similar to the Iranian beverage Sekanjabin.

Preparation 
An example recipe for making a glass of Shikanjvi:

Ingredients:  two lemons (squeezed to make lemon juice), one little chunk of ginger, one or two teaspoons of sugar (raw if possible), half a teaspoon of salt and half a teaspoon of pepper.
Process:  Pour cold drinking water in a glass. Add the lemon juice, ginger, sugar, salt and pepper. Shake it vigorously. This is a traditional recipe; however, people can experiment using mint leaves, rose water, etc.

See also

 List of Indian drinks
 List of lemonade topics
 List of lemon dishes and beverages
 Lemonade
 Limeade
 Banta

References

Non-alcoholic drinks
Pakistani drinks
Indian drinks
Lemonade